Valsgärde or Vallsgärde is a farm on the Fyris river, about three kilometres north of Gamla Uppsala, the ancient centre of the Swedish kings and of the pagan faith in Sweden. The present farm dates from the 16th century. The farm's notability derives from the presence of a burial site from the Swedish Vendel Age (part of the Iron Age (c. 550–793) and the Viking Age); it was used for more than 300 years. The first ship burial is from the 6th century and the last graves are from the 11th century.

Excavation

The site was found and excavated by archaeologists in the 1920s, and before this similar graves had only been found at Vendel, which gave its name to this period of the Scandinavian Iron Age. The graves are princely, and are almost identical to ones found in England, at Sutton Hoo in East Anglia dated probably to 610-635. There are several theories about the identities of those buried, ranging from the Ynglings (Scylfings) to powerful warriors within the Leidang system, or local strongmen who had enriched themselves through trade due to the area's strategic position between the fjord of Mälaren and the important region of Tiundaland.  There are so many rich graves that it is likely that most of them were royalty.

References
Arwidsson, Greta (1942)  Valsgärde 6 (Almqvist & Wiksells Boktryckeri-A.B. Uppsala) 
Arwidsson, Greta (1977)  Valsgärde 7 (Berlingska Boktryckeriet. Uppsala) 
Arwidsson, Greta (1954)  Valsgärde 8 (Almqvist & Wiksells Boktryckeri-A.B. Uppsala) 
Fridell, Allan (1930) First Ship burial at Valsgärde in Gamla Uppsala parish  (Fornvännen)  
Schönbäck, Bengt: (2002) De vikingatida båtgravarna vid Valsgärde - relativ kronologi (Fornvännen)

External links

Gamla Uppsala — Archæological information from the Swedish National Heritage Board.
Ljungqvist 2008 — General article on the Valsgärde site.

Archaeological sites in Sweden
Viking Age populated places
Farms in Sweden
Viking ship burials
Vendel Period